The Delinquents are a rap group from Oakland, California, composed of two members, Glen Jones a.k.a. G-Stack, Vidal Prevost a.k.a. V-White (formerly known as V-Dal) and Ghost Producer Gregory Turner a.k.a. Lord Gregory(formerly known as G-Black. They were established in July 1991 and were known for their playful brand of gangsta rap. G-Stack is a member of Thizz Entertainment.

Discography

Studio albums
Big Moves (1997)
Bosses Will Be Bosses (1999)
Town Business Part I (2003)

Compilation albums
The Audio Biography: 1992–2000 Vol. 1 (2001)
The Dominion (2001)
The Dominion Continues... (2002)

Mixtapes
Delinquents – Mix CD Vol. 1 (2003)
The Purple Project – Mix CD Vol. 2 (2003)
Have Money, Have Heart Part 1 – Mix CD Vol. 3 (2005)

Extended plays
Insane (1992)
The Alleyway (1994)
Outta Control (1995)

Solo projects

G-Stack
Thizz Nation, Vol. 18 with Mistah F.A.B. (2007)
Welcome to Purple City – Vol. 1 (2007)
Tha Color Purple – Vol. 2 (2007)
Dr. Purp Thumb (2009)

V-White
Perfect Timin (2007)
Stimulus Package with The Politician (2010)
Streets Can Vouch with The Politician (2010)
The Gas Station with The Politician (2011)

External links 
The Delinquents at Discogs
The Delinquents at iTunes Store
The Delinquents at MySpace
G-Stack at Discogs
G-Stack at MySpace
V-White at Discogs
V-White at MySpace

Hip hop groups from California
Musical groups disestablished in 2005
Musical groups established in 1991
Musical groups from Oakland, California
American musical duos
Hip hop duos
Gangsta rap groups
1991 establishments in California